Bernard Rooke (born 1938) is a British artist and studio potter. Rooke has exhibited his "Brutalist" ceramics and painting both in the UK and abroad with work in many collections both public and private including the Victoria and Albert Museum, Cleveland Museum of Art, Nuffield Foundation, Paisley Museum and Art Galleries, Leicester Museum, Buckinghamshire County Museum, Röhsska Museum in Sweden and the Trondheim Kunstmuseum in Norway. His work has become sought after at auction houses  in the UK and USA.

Early years 

Bernard Rooke attended Ipswich School of Art  studying painting and lithography before going on to study at Goldsmiths College of Art. It was while studying here that he decided to take up pottery. Although unfamiliar with this craft and tradition, he found that working with clay provided new opportunities for freedom of interpretation and creativity.

Forest Hill studio 

In 1960, Rooke set up his first pottery in Forest Hill in South London along with Alan Wallwork. It was a very small room with enough space for a small electric kiln. He was initially using mainly hand building, coiling, blocking and slabbing techniques. While researching ideas, he was supporting himself by part-time lecturing at London University, Goldsmiths College and St Mary's College. In addition, Rooke's membership of 'The Craftsman Potters' Association' enabled him to show his work in a shop in Carnaby Street in London.

The Old Mill, Swilland in Suffolk 

In 1967, both the need for a larger working space and becoming disillusioned with living in London spurred Rooke into moving out of the city and to an old mill building in Swilland in Suffolk. Rooke wanted to widen the range of work so as to become more commercial. With the birth of his son, Aaron, and much needed work to be done on the mill, it was important to be able to make a living.

In 1968, the Grand Metropolitan Hotel commissioned Rooke to make 120 standard lamps, 120 table lamps as well as a 24 foot long ceramic mural and another 9 foot high, which incorporated interior lighting. The money from the commission helped to pay for much needed restoration work on the mill.

By the 1970s, a gallery space was opened in the windmill  and run by Susan Rooke, Bernard's wife, selling work to locals and tourists as well as to American airmen based nearby. The vision for Mill Gallery was beginning to develop and alongside this a reputation was building bringing in a good source of income.

Later years 

Sons Aaron  and Felix were becoming more involved with the running of the pottery, giving Bernard more time to develop new ideas and designs and more time to continue with his painting. In 2004, the Rooke family decided not to sell to the public through the gallery anymore and close the pottery to concentrate more on painting and printmaking.

In 2017 Bernard's lighting was featured in the Exhibition: “Glass, Light, Paint & Clay”  at the Peterborough Museum and Art Gallery. The exhibition featured four artists: Bernard Rooke, John Maltby, Duncan Clarke and Sam Herman selected from the Graham Cooley collection. The catalogue features an interview with Bernard in which he describes his life and work.

References 

1938 births
Living people
English potters
Alumni of Goldsmiths, University of London
20th-century ceramists